Neidenstein is a village and a municipality in south western Germany. It is located between Heidelberg and Sinsheim in the Rhein-Neckar district in the state of Baden-Württemberg.

History 
In 1319 Neidenstein was founded by Heinrich von Venningen. Until Neidenstein became a part of Baden in 1805 it belonged to the family of the Lords of Venningen.

References 

Rhein-Neckar-Kreis